James Edgar Lindsey (born November 24, 1944) is a former American football running back for the Minnesota Vikings of the National Football League, having played from 1966 to 1972. Today he is a real estate agent and golf developer.

Sports

Arkansas Razorbacks Football

Lindsey was a member of the 1964 national championship-winning football team at the University of Arkansas, and founded Lindsey & Associates in Fayetteville, Arkansas in 1972. James Lindsey is a member of the Kappa Sigma fraternity at the University of Arkansas - Xi Chapter. He completed a degree in mathematics.

Lindsey was a member of the University of Arkansas board of trustees and was a central to many of the decisions made by the board, including the hiring of head football coach Houston Nutt in 1997 and the decision to continue to play football games at War Memorial Stadium in Little Rock, Arkansas.

Minnesota Vikings

Lindsey was a running back for the Vikings, most often used for punting and kickoff returns. He played from 1966-1972.

Politics

In 1976, Lindsey filed for governor of Arkansas as a Democrat but lost in the primary election to incumbent David H. Pryor. He ran as a conservative and questioned a 20 percent increase in violent crime in Arkansas during 1975, Pryor's first year in office. Lindsey was initially approached by Republicans about carrying their gubernatorial banner in the general election. When Lindsey spurned the GOP recruitment, the party nominated an unknown plumber from Pine Bluff, Leon Griffith, to act as its placeholder nominee. Lindsey joined the GOP several years later.

Real Estate and Golf

As a 21-year-old, Lindsey used his $75,000 NFL signing bonus to purchase a tract of land in Northwest Arkansas, his starting point in buying and selling real estate, an occupation he pursued during his off-seasons, and which became his main occupation after retirement from football. As of 2013, Lindsey's company owned more than 37,000 apartment units and 42 golf courses.

Lindsey Golf courses are located in Alabama, Arkansas, Kansas, Mississippi, Missouri, Oklahoma and Tennessee. Courses range from 9-18 holes, with many of them featuring a links style design. These courses tend to fill a niche for affordable public golf courses, but that are maintained at country-club level standards.

Documentary Film
In 2011, production began on a documentary film covering Lindsey's life. Narrated by Dallas Cowboys owner Jerry Jones, "The Jim Lindsey Story" details Lindsey's youth in the Arkansas Delta, role during the 1964 championship season, time in the National Football League, and rise in real-estate. The film features interviews with College Football Hall of Fame coach Frank Broyles, former Arkansas head coach Ken Hatfield, former NFL players Fred Cox and Dave Osborn, and Pro Football Hall of Fame coach Bud Grant. Executive produced by Emmy Award winners Larry Foley and Dale Carpenter, the documentary is presented by the University of Arkansas's Walter J. Lemke Department of Journalism. "The Jim Lindsey Story" is scheduled for release in fall of 2013.

References

External links
 Jim Lindsey's statistics
 "The Jim Lindsey Story" official site
 "The Jim Lindsey Story" at Internet Movie Database

1944 births
Living people
American football running backs
Arkansas Razorbacks football players
Minnesota Vikings players
Arkansas Democrats
People from St. Francis County, Arkansas
Players of American football from Arkansas